NrsZ (nitrogen regulated small RNA) is a bacterial small RNA found in the opportunistic pathogen Pseudomonas aeruginosa PAO1. Its transcription is induced during nitrogen limitation by the NtrB/C two-component system (an important regulator of nitrogen assimilation and swarming motility) together with the alternative sigma factor RpoN ( a global regulator involved in nitrogen metabolism). NrsZ by activating rhlA (a gene essential for rhamnolipids synthesis) positively regulates the production of rhamnolipid surfactants needed for swarming motility.

See also 
 Pseudomonas sRNA
 SrbA sRNA
 AsponA antisense RNA

References 

Non-coding RNA